The 2019 M2 X Genie Music Awards was held at the Olympic Gymnastics Arena (KSPO Dome) in Seoul, South Korea on August 1, 2019. The event was the second edition of the awards ceremony and was hosted by model Han Hye-jin. The 2019 edition is named the "M2 X Genie Music Awards" (MGMA) as with their partnership with Mnet's digital studio, M2. The eligibility period for nominations was between July 1, 2018, and June 19, 2019.

Performances 
 Chungha – "Gotta Go" + "Snapping"
 Verivery – "Boy With Luv" (BTS), "Oh My!" (Seventeen) mashup + "Tempo" (Exo) 
 Nature – "Solo" (Jennie) 
 Bvndit – "Twit" (Hwasa)
 Nature & Bvndit – "Shoot Out" (Monsta X) 
 Nature & Verivery & Bvndit – "Yes or Yes" (Twice)
 TXT – "Crown"
 Day6 – "Bookmarks" (medley) + "Time of Our Life"
 AB6IX – "Absolute" + "Breathe"
 Paul Kim – "Every Day, Every Moment" + "Me After You" Part 1 & 2
 Itzy – "Icy" + "Dalla Dalla"
 WJSN – "I Swear" + "Touch My Body" (Sistar)
 Pentagon – "Naughty Boy" + "Humph!"
 WJSN – "Boogie Up!"
 Kim Jae-hwan – "My Star" + "Begin Again"
 Iz*One – "Violeta" + "Highlight"
 Mamamoo – "Wind Flower" + "Gogobebe"
 EXID's Solji and B1A4's Sandeul – "Instinctively" + "Uphill Road" (Yoon Jong-shin)
 Twice – "Breakthrough" + "Fancy" + "Dance the Night Away"

Judging criteria

Winners and nominees 
Winners are highlighted in bold. Voting took place on the Genie Music website between June 20 to July 4, 2019.

Main awards

Other awards 

 Global Popularity Award – BTS
 The Performance Creator – Lia Kim
 M2 Hot Star Award – Pentagon, WJSN
 Genie Music Next Generation Star – Kim Jae-hwan, AB6IX
 The Genie Music Popularity Award – BTS
 The Innovator – Yoon Jong-shin

References 

South Korean music awards
2019 music awards